Burden Bearer is a bluegrass gospel album by Doyle Lawson and Quicksilver, released on July 8, 2016. The album was nominated for a Grammy Award for Best Bluegrass Album in December 2016.

Critical reception
John Lawless of Bluegrass Today says the album may be "the definitive album in [the bluegrass gospel] genre" and believes the performances sets it apart more than the songs themselves.

Track listing

Personnel 
 Doyle Lawson – baritone, guitar, mandolin, tenor, vocals (baritone, tenor)
 Stephen Burwell – fiddle, fiddle harmonics
 Joe Dean – banjo, guitar
 Eli Johnston – bass, guitar, vocals (baritone)
 Dustin Pyrtle – guitar, vocals (tenor)
 Josh Swift – guitar (resonator, rhythm), percussion, piano, vocals (bass)

References

2016 albums
Doyle Lawson albums